Howard Murphy is a former American football coach. He served as the head football coach at Westfield State University in Westfield, Massachusetts for three seasons, from 1983 to 1985, compiling a record of 11–17.

Head coaching record

References

Year of birth missing (living people)
Living people
Westfield State Owls football coaches